The Bartang (Russian and Tajik: Бартанг) is a river of Central Asia, tributary to the Panj and consequently to the Amu Darya. In its upper reaches, it is also known as the Murghab and Aksu; it flows through the Wakhan in Afghanistan, then through the Rushon District of the Gorno-Badakhshan autonomous region, Tajikistan.

Course
The river rises in Chaqmaqtin Lake in the Little Pamir in the Wakhan, where it is known as the Aksu or Oksu ("white water").  It then flows east and crosses into Tajikistan, then turns north to the city of Murghab passing the village of Shaimak.

Below the city of Murghab the river is called the Murghab (Murghob meaning "Bird River",  - Murgab).
.  A few kilometres below Murghab is Sarez Lake, formed by a landslide during the 1911 Sarez earthquake, which created the world's highest natural dam, Usoi Dam.
 
The river is joined by the Ghudara river just below Sarez Lake.  From the junction the river is known as the Bartang.  The Bartang traces a route down the western Pamir Mountains, flowing  before becoming a tributary to the Panj at the border of Tajikistan and Afghanistan.  Much of the river lies within the boundaries of Tajik National Park.  The Bartang is fed mostly by glacier and snow melt.  It is the only river to cross Gorno-Badakhshan from east to west. 

The Bartang enters the Panj just upstream from the town of Rushon.

Access
'Bartang' means 'narrow passage'. Before the 20th century travel required fords, ladders and platforms set into the sides of cliffs. There were three paths, one along the river, usable only in autumn when the water was low, the second along the cliffs and the third, much longer, where pack animals could be led along the mountain ridges. The modern road can become impassable beyond Basid due to rockslides.  Above Basid is the large village of Roshov. Above that the Ghudara River and the Murghab Rivers join to form the Bartang. The road follows the Ghudata northeast to its junction with the Tanimas which leads west to the Fedchenko Glacier. A road of sorts continues east to lake Karakul.

The Murghab is generally not passable except as an adventure. There is a dirt road for the last 37 km to Murghab town.  Above Murghab a jeep road, of decreasing quality, follows the river southeast to Tokhtamish and Shaimak.

Sarez Lake

On February 18, 1911, the 1911 Sarez earthquake, estimated at 7.4 on the Richter magnitude scale, caused a large landslide which completely blocked the flow of the Murghab and buried a local village.  The landslide, estimated at two cubic kilometers of rock, formed a natural dam called the Usoi Dam.  Over the following months the Murghab filled the space behind the Usoi to form Sarez Lake, which now fills about 60 kilometers in length of the Murghab river valley and contains 17 cubic kilometers of water.  Geologists believe that the dam may be unstable and could collapse during a future strong earthquake, either from structural failure of the earthen dam itself or liquefaction of the soil & rock debris making up the dam. The Usoi Dam wall survived a localised 7.2 magnitude earthquake, the 2015 Tajikistan earthquake, on the 7th December 2015 with no visible signs of deterioration.

Notes

References
Kolesnikova, V. (April 2002). "Tajik Forests: What Happened to the 'Crimea Gardens' and their Inhabitants". Russian Forest Bulletin: Issue 20, April 2002.
"Sarez and Yashikul Lakes".  The Great Game Travel Company.  Retrieved August 25, 2005.
Google Maps satellite photographs of eastern Tajikistan and Afghanistan.

External links
Map of major river drainage basins within Tajikistan
Index of maps and graphs related to Tajikistan water resources
Map of Gorno-Badakhshan region of Tajikistan
Description of a bicycle ride in Tajikistan, including the Bartang Valley

Rivers of Tajikistan
Rivers of Afghanistan
International rivers of Asia
Gorno-Badakhshan Autonomous Region